Pedro Caino (29 June 1956 – 14 August 2014) was an Argentine cyclist. He competed in the individual pursuit and team pursuit events at the 1984 Summer Olympics.

References

External links
 

1956 births
2014 deaths
Argentine male cyclists
Olympic cyclists of Argentina
Cyclists at the 1984 Summer Olympics
Pan American Games medalists in cycling
Pan American Games bronze medalists for Argentina
Cyclists at the 1979 Pan American Games
Sportspeople from Entre Ríos Province